is a character designer and animation director who works with Madhouse, a Japanese animation company. His work is recognised in the Yoshiaki Kawajiri movies he has designed characters for, among them Ninja Scroll and Vampire Hunter D: Bloodlust. He also did the character design and animation direction for the short "Program" in The Animatrix.

Works

References

Yutaka Minowa Interview at dvdvisionjapan.com
Yutaka Minowa Interview on The Animatrix

External links
  
 
 
 

Japanese cartoonists
Japanese animators
Japanese animated film directors
Madhouse (company) people
Living people
Year of birth missing (living people)